Anton Chuvakin is a computer security specialist, currently  a Research Director at Gartner for Technical Professionals (GTP) Security and Risk Management Strategies (SRMS) team.  Formerly he was a principal at Security Warrior Consulting. Previous positions included roles of a Director of PCI Compliance Solutions at Qualys, a U.S. Vulnerability management company, a Chief Logging Evangelist with LogLogic, a U.S. Log Management and Intelligence company and a Security Strategist with netForensics, a U.S. Security information management company.

A physicist by education (M.S. Moscow State University,
Ph.D. State University of New York at Stony Brook), he is an author of many publications and invited talks on computer and network security and a
co-author of "Security Warrior" published in 2004 by O'Reilly and later translated and published in German, Polish and Japanese. His other books include "PCI Compliance" republished in 2009 (second edition) by Syngress Publishing and  "Logging and Log Management: The Authoritative Guide to Understanding the Concepts Surrounding Logging and Log Management" published in 2012 by Syngress Publishing.

Anton's contributions to information security are focused on log management  and PCI DSS compliance.

See also
Computer security
Computer insecurity
Reverse engineering

External links
Anton Chuvakin information security publications
Anton Chuvakin Consulting Services
"PCI Compliance" book by Dr. Anton Chuvakin, official site
Anton Chuvakin Security Blog
Security Warrior at Google Books
PCI Compliance at Google Books

References

Writers about computer security
Moscow State University alumni
Living people
Year of birth missing (living people)